The Battle of Sarai Nurdin was fought between the Khalsa's 2 Sikhs Bhai Bota and Bhai Garja Singh and the Mughal forces led by Zakariya Khan. This battle is one of the most important battles in Sikh history, and is one the of the most significant battles after Banda Singh Bahadur's death.

Background

Zakariya Khan had slaughtered many Sikhs which had forced Sikhs to go into hiding. The Mughals believed that the Sikhs had all died. No skirmishes involving Sikhs were reported.

Sikh tradition states 2 travellers had seen Bhai Bota Singh walking and had called him a coward and said he could not be a Sikh as he is hiding from the Mughals. After listening to their conversation, he thought to himself that he needed to fight and not hide. He then proceeded towards a road at Sarai Nurdin. There he created a checkpoint and a toll tax barrier which made travellers pay the Khalsa Royal Tax in order to pass. Another Sikh named Garja Singh joined Bota Singh and they started collecting the Khalsa Royal Tax. Zakariya Khan heard about this and immediately sent a Mughal force there under Jalal Din with 100-1000 Calvary.

Battle

Initially Jalal Din requested the Sikhs to surrender but they refused.One Sikh had a wooden staff and the other Sikh had a spear and one-edged daggar. The Mughal forces were fully armed. Both the Singhs fought with electrifying speed and beat all the soldiers who came to their way. The Sikhs had killed around 20 soldiers without signs of exhaustion. Since fighting in horses wasn't working, the Mughals decided to retreat and send soldiers on foot. The staff Bhai Bota had was enough to damage the Mughal shields. Soon the Mughals realized that they can't fight the Sikhs in hand-to-hand combat so they finally brought in bullets. Even after being shot, the Sikhs tried their best to fight with one leg and they didn't give up until their last breath.

References

See also 

 Nihang
 Zakariya Khan Bahadur
 Ratan Singh Bhangu

Battles involving the Sikhs